Darron Brown (born 12 July 1970 from Ripley, Derbyshire) is a professional English former darts player who plays in the Professional Darts Corporation events.

He won a PDC Tour Card in 2016.

Darts career
Brown have made debut he losing to Ryan Harrington 6 legs to 4 on the 2016 UK Open in the stage Last 96.

References

External links
Profile and stats on Darts Database

1970 births
Living people
English darts players
People from Ripley, Derbyshire
Sportspeople from Derbyshire
Professional Darts Corporation former tour card holders